The Count of Ten is a 1928 American silent sports drama film directed by James Flood and starring Charles Ray, James Gleason and Jobyna Ralston.

Cast
 Charles Ray as Johnny McKinney
 James Gleason as Johnny's Manager
 Jobyna Ralston as Betty McKinney
 Edythe Chapman as Mother McKinney
 Arthur Lake as Betty's Brother
 Charles Sellon as Betty's Father
 George Magrill as Cleaver
 Jackie Combs  as Baby McKinney

References

Bibliography
 Goble, Alan. The Complete Index to Literary Sources in Film. Walter de Gruyter, 1999.

External links

1928 films
1920s sports drama films
American sports drama films
Films directed by James Flood
American silent feature films
1920s English-language films
Universal Pictures films
American black-and-white films
American boxing films
1928 drama films
1920s American films
Silent American drama films
Silent sports drama films